Ana Carolina Soares Nakamura (born 9 May 1983, in Rio de Janeiro) more popularly known as Carol Nakamura is a Brazilian dancer, actress, and television personality.

Career
For twelve years, Nakamura was a member of the popular Brazilian television show Domingão do Faustão. She started off in the mid-2000s as a ballet dancer in the show and eventually became one of the co-presenters with Fausto Silva. Nakamura left the show in April 2016 as she was signed by Globo TV and decided to shift her focus to acting. In September 2016, Nakamura returned to the show as a judge.

Nakamura starred as Hiromi in the Brazilian drama Sol Nascente, which contained a large sub-plot focused on Brazilian-Japanese society.

In addition to dancing and television, Nakamura is also a theater actor, taking part in several productions. She made her debut in a comedy in September  2017.

Filmography

Television

Theater

Personal life
Nakamura became a mother at the age of 16. Her son Juan is often mistaken for her brother. Nakamura, of Japanese descent, says that she experienced some ridicule and bullying in her youth because of her Asian heritage.

From 2014 to 2017, she has been in a relationship with Brazilian footballer Aislan. The couple are in a civil union but Nakamura says that she has no plans to get married. The two did eventually get engaged in January 2017, but in October, Nakamura called the wedding off and broke up with Aislan.

References

External links
 

1983 births
Living people
Actresses from Rio de Janeiro (city)
Brazilian female models
Brazilian television presenters
Brazilian people of Japanese descent
Actresses of Japanese descent
21st-century Brazilian dancers
21st-century Brazilian actresses
Brazilian women television presenters